Nathaniel Kingsbury represented Dedham, Massachusetts in the Great and General Court. He was also town clerk in 1783 and served five terms as selectman, beginning in 1773.

References

Works cited

Members of the Massachusetts General Court
Year of birth missing
Year of death missing
Dedham, Massachusetts selectmen
Dedham Town Clerks